Francis Reed may refer to:

 Francis Reed (cricketer) (1850–1912), English cricketer
 Francis Reed (inventor) (1852–1917), American inventor